Sarisa is a monotypic moth genus in the family Geometridae and was first described by David Stephen Fletcher in 1979. The genus contains only one species, Sarisa muriferata, the hook-tip fern looper, which is endemic to New Zealand and surrounding islands. This species was described by Francis Walker in 1862. It is widespread in the North and South Islands, and has been recorded from Stewart Island, Big South Cape Island, the Chatham Islands and the Auckland Islands.

Taxonomy 
The genus Sarisa was first described by Fletcher in 1979. Sarisa is a replacement name for the genus Gargaphia, Walker 1863 which was preoccupied by Gargaphia, Stål, 1862. The only species in this genus, S. muriferata, was originally described by Francis Walker in 1863 and named Gargaphia muriferata. The female holotype is held at the Natural History Museum, London.

Description 
Full-grown larvae are approximately 30 mm long, are thin and coloured a reddish brown with an interrupted black dorsal line containing five oblong yellowish-brown spots. 

Adults have functional mouthparts and are attracted to nectar sources.

Distribution 
This species is endemic to New Zealand and its surrounding islands.

Behaviour 
The larvae are active in summer and autumn. They hide during the day in leaf litter and are active at night feeding on host plants. If disturbed a larva will fall to the ground and will then attempt to bury itself in the leaf litter. This type of evasive behaviour is also seen in adults of the species. The moth will drop to the ground when disturbed or attacked, with wings held motionless. The shape and colouring of the wings contribute to a most effective dead leaf crypsis. The species overwinters in the pupal stage. The adult moth can be found on the wing all year round. There are probably two generations per year in the North and South Islands, with adults recorded from September to March. At the southern limit of its range there is probably one generation per year, flying during January and February.

Host species 
The larvae have been recorded feeding on Microsorum pustulatum and Dicksonia fibrosa. They have also been observed feeding on the leaves and sori of Pyrrosia eleagnifolia.

References

Lithinini
Moths of New Zealand
Endemic fauna of New Zealand
Taxa named by Francis Walker (entomologist)
Moths described in 1863
Monotypic moth genera
Endemic moths of New Zealand